A metamorphic reaction is a chemical reaction that takes place during the geological process of metamorphism wherein one assemblage of minerals is transformed into a second assemblage which is stable under the new temperature/pressure conditions resulting in the final stable state of the observed metamorphic rock.

Examples include the production of talc under varied metamorphic conditions:
serpentine + carbon dioxide → talc + magnesite + water
chlorite + quartz → kyanite + talc + water

Polymorphic Transformations

Exsolution Reactions

Devolatilization Reactions

Continuous Reactions

Ion Exchange Reactions

Oxidation/Reduction Reactions

Reactions Involving Dissolved Species

Chemographics

Petrogenetic Grids

Schreinemakers Method

Reaction Mechanisms

See also 
 Index mineral

Notes

Metamorphic petrology
Geochemical processes
Reaction mechanisms